Kuh Neshin (also Romanized as Kūh Neshīn) is a village in Majin Rural District, Majin District, Darreh Shahr County, Ilam Province, Iran. According to the 2006 census, its population was 29, with six families.

References 

Populated places in Darreh Shahr County